Pharma Medica Research Inc. is a Canadian research and development company that works with pharmaceutical companies and performs clinical trials in the pharmaceutical and biotechnology industry. The company is based near Toronto, Canada with headquarters in Mississauga, Ontario. Pharma Medica has locations in Scarborough, Ontario

History
Pharma Medica was founded in 1997. The former subsidiary of Cipher Pharmaceuticals, Inc., develops and researches medical writing, bioanalysis, data management, and clinical trial monitoring. It has conducted over 4000 clinical trials and is certified GLP compliant.

In 2012, Omnicomm Systems licensed TrialMaster EDC to Pharma Medica to use the software in clinical trials.

Governor Jay Nixon of Missouri met with Pharma Medica at the 2013 International BIO Convention in Chicago to discuss growth into Missouri, the United States national leader in the biotechnology, agribusiness, and life science industry. The company’s first expansion outside of Canada opened in St. Charles, Missouri in November 2013. The St. Charles expansion cost the company $30.8 million and was to create 320 new jobs to be hired out in the course of three years. This U.S. site had capacity to operate 10 clinics, and after operating for over 5 years in St. Charles, Pharma Medica Research Inc. USA ceased operations in 2019, but continues to operate in Ontario, Canada.

References

Companies based in Toronto
Canadian medical research
Pharmacy organizations in Canada
Clinical trial organizations